The Pets Factor is a British children's television documentary series, which has aired on CBBC since 20 June 2017. The series, produced by True North Productions, follows the work of four vets in the UK: Rory Cowlam, Cheryl Lucas, Cat Henstridge and James Greenwood. Stacey Dooley presented the first four seasons, after which the vets took on the role between themselves. New vet Fabian Rivers joined in season 7.

Episodes

Series 1 (2017)

References

External links

2017 British television series debuts
2010s British children's television series
2020s British children's television series
BBC high definition shows
British documentary television series
BBC children's television shows
English-language television shows
Stacey Dooley